is a private university in Nagareyama, Chiba, Japan, established in 1990. The school has two divisions, a College of Sociology and a College of Media and Mass Communication.

Academics

College of Sociology 

 Department of Psychology and Humanities
 Department of Contemporary Sociology
 Department of Business Management

College of Media and Communication 

 Department of Mass Communication
 Department of Communication and Business
 Department of Childhood and Communication Studies

Notable alumni
Kimiko Koyama
Karin Maruyama
Ryuto Yasuoka

References

External links
 Official website 
 Official website 

Educational institutions established in 1990
Private universities and colleges in Japan
Universities and colleges in Chiba Prefecture
1990 establishments in Japan